Borče Daskalovski  (born August 22, 1983) is a former Macedonian professional basketball player, and currently coach of MZT Skopje UNI Banka.

On 4 July 2017, he became a head coach of Karpoš Sokoli.

References

External links
BGBasket profile
FIBA profile

1983 births
Living people
Macedonian basketball coaches
Macedonian men's basketball players
Shooting guards
Sportspeople from Skopje